Deming Municipal Airport  is two miles southeast of Deming, in Luna County, New Mexico, United States.

Facilities
It has two asphalt runways: 8/26 is 6,627 by 75 feet (2,020 x 23 m) and 4/22 is 5,675 by 60 feet (1,730 x 18 m).

In the year ending April 13, 2008 the airport had 28,655 aircraft operations, average 78 per day: 65% general aviation, 32% military and 3% air taxi. 17 aircraft were then based at this airport: 94% single-engine and 6% multi-engine.

World War II

The airfield was activated on 15 November 1942. It conducted bombardier training for USAAF Gulf Coast Training Center (later Central Flying Command). The first class of bombardiers graduated on 6 March. In the next three years an estimated 12,000 cadets passed through the Deming school. The bombardier trainer used was the Beech AT-11 Kansan.

The airfield was assigned to Second Air Force 16th Bombardment Training Wing on 31 December 1944. It conducted B-29 Superfortress group bombardment training until the end of World War II, when the training program at Deming wound down and was inactivated 18 December 1945. The airfield was closed on 31 January 1946. It was eventually discharged to the War Assets Administration (WAA) and sold.

Past airline service 
Frontier Airlines (1950-1986) DC-3s served Deming starting in July, 1950, flying El Paso to Phoenix via Las Cruces, Deming, and Lordsburg, New Mexico as well as Clifton, Safford, and Tucson, Arizona. The service ended in April, 1953.

See also

 New Mexico World War II Army Airfields
 38th Flying Training Wing (World War II)

References

 Manning, Thomas A. (2005), History of Air Education and Training Command, 1942–2002.  Office of History and Research, Headquarters, AETC, Randolph AFB, Texas 
 Shaw, Frederick J. (2004), Locating Air Force Base Sites, History’s Legacy, Air Force History and Museums Program, United States Air Force, Washington DC.

External links

 Deming Municipal Airport at City of Deming website
 Aerial photo as of 21 September 1996 from USGS The National Map
 

1942 establishments in New Mexico
Airports established in 1942
Airports in New Mexico
Transportation in Luna County, New Mexico
World War II airfields in the United States
USAAF Bombardiers School
Airfields of the United States Army Air Forces in New Mexico
Buildings and structures in Luna County, New Mexico
USAAF Western Flying Training Command
American Theater of World War II